The Secret Daughter is an Australian television drama series which premiered on the Seven Network on 3 October 2016. The series is written by Justin Monjo, Greg Haddrick, Louise Bowes and Keith Thompson and directed by Leah Purcell, Geoff Bennett and Paul Moloney. The drama centres on part-time country pub singer Billie Carter (Jessica Mauboy), who has a chance meeting with a wealthy city hotelier and discovers information about her family and history. The second season premiered on 8 November 2017. On 17 December 2017, it was announced that The Secret Daughter would not return for a third season in 2018.

Production
The series received a total of A$171,750 in funding from Screen NSW. Filming on the series took place in Sydney and regional New South Wales and wrapped in June 2016.

The Seven Network announced in 2016 that the series had been renewed and a second season would screen in 2017. Production began in May 2017 with James Sweeny and Rachael Maza joining the cast.

A distinguishing feature of the program was its musical aspect was performed almost entirely by Mauboy herself.

Cast

Main
 Jessica Mauboy as Billie Carter
 David Field as Gus Carter
 Matt Levett as Jamie Norton
 Jared Turner as Chris Norton
 Rachel Gordon as Susan Norton
 Jordan Hare as Harriet Norton

Supporting
 Colin Friels as Jack Norton
 Salvatore Coco as Bruno Rossi
 Bonnie Sveen as Layla Chapple
 J.R. Reyne as Dan Delaney
 Libby Asciak as Rachel Rossi
 Johnny Boxer as Lloyd Dobson
 Terry Serio as Carmine
 Harriet Gordon-Anderson as Zoe Menkell
 Jeremy Ambrum as Shorty
 Amanda Muggleton as Connie Di Maria
 Renee Lim as Vivienne Hart
 Ryan O'Kane as Charlie Stryver
 Erin Holland as Della Jensen
 James Sweeny as Marc Laurent

Series overview

Episodes

Season 1 (2016)

Season 2 (2017)

Viewership

Season 1 (2016)

Season 2 (2017)

Music
The show's first soundtrack album, The Secret Daughter: Songs from the Original TV Series, was recorded by Jessica Mauboy and featured music used in the first season. It was released on 14 October 2016 by Sony Music Australia. The album became Mauboy's first number-one album and also made her the first Indigenous artist to reach number one on the ARIA Albums Chart. The second soundtrack album, The Secret Daughter Season Two: Songs from the Original 7 Series, was also recorded by Mauboy and released on 6 October 2017.

References

External links
 
  at Screen Australia

2016 Australian television series debuts
2017 Australian television series endings
Television shows set in Sydney
Television shows set in New South Wales
Australian drama television series
English-language television shows
Seven Network original programming
Television series by Screentime
Indigenous Australian television series